Weiping Zou is the Charles B. de Nancrede Professor of Pathology, Immunology, Biology, and Surgery at the University of Michigan. He is a scientist noted for his work regarding understanding the nature of human tumor immune responses and developing mechanism-informed combination therapies for cancer. He has developed an international reputation in human tumor immunosuppressive mechanisms in the tumor microenvironment.

Career 
Zou serves as Director of the Center of Excellence for Cancer Immunology and Immunotherapy, Co-Director of the Cancer Hematopoiesis and Immunology Program, and directs the Immunologic Monitoring Core at the University of Michigan Medical School and University of Michigan Rogel Cancer Center. He also directs the Surgical Oncology Fellow Training (T32) program, through which clinical fellows are trained to become physician scientists, with a focus on cancer immunology and immunotherapy. At the national level, he is the American Association for Cancer Research Cancer Immunology (CIMM) Chairperson 2019-2020 and has served as the Abstract Programming Chair for the American Association of Immunologists for 4 years.

He has delivered more than 300 invited lectures at different institutions and conferences and has published nearly 200 articles and book chapters - including 36 articles in Nature, Science, and Cell journal series. His laboratory is one of the most cited research teams in the field of immunology and their work has been highlighted by many scientific news agencies. “Specific recruitment of regulatory T cells in ovarian carcinoma fosters immune privilege and predicts reduced survival”, an original work on human Tregs, has been cited more than 5,000 times since its publication.

Recent Publications

Zhou, J. et al. The ubiquitin ligase MDM2 sustains STAT5 stability to control T cell-mediated antitumor immunity. Nat Immunol, doi:10.1038/s41590-021-00888-3 (2021).
 Yu, J. et al. Liver metastasis restrains immunotherapy efficacy via macrophage-mediated T cell elimination. Nat Med 27, 152-164, doi:10.1038/s41591-020-1131-x (2021).
 Xia, H., Green, D. R. & Zou, W. Autophagy in tumour immunity and therapy. Nat Rev Cancer, doi:10.1038/s41568-021-00344-2 (2021).
 Lin, H. et al. Stanniocalcin 1 is a phagocytosis checkpoint driving tumor immune resistance. Cancer Cell, doi:10.1016/j.ccell.2020.12.023 (2021).
 Li, G. et al. LIMIT is an immunogenic lncRNA in cancer immunity and immunotherapy. Nat Cell Biol 23, 526-537, doi:10.1038/s41556-021-00672-3 (2021).
 Du, W. et al. Loss of optineurin drives cancer immune evasion via palmitoylation-dependent IFNGR1 lysosomal sorting and degradation. Cancer Discov, doi:10.1158/2159-8290.CD-20-1571 (2021).
 Wang, W. & Zou, W. Amino Acids and Their Transporters in T Cell Immunity and Cancer Therapy. Mol Cell 80, 384-395, doi:10.1016/j.molcel.2020.09.006 (2020).
 Li, J. et al. Epigenetic driver mutations in ARID1A shape cancer immune phenotype and immunotherapy. J Clin Invest 130, 2712-2726, doi:10.1172/JCI134402 (2020).
 Bian, Y. et al. Cancer SLC43A2 alters T cell methionine metabolism and histone methylation. Nature 585, 277-282, doi:10.1038/s41586-020-2682-1 (2020).
 Wang, W. et al. CD8+ T cells regulate tumour ferroptosis during cancer immunotherapy. Nature 569, 270-274, doi:10.1038/s41586-019-1170-y (2019).
 Wu, Y. et al. Inactivation of CDK12 Delineates a Distinct Immunogenic Class of Advanced Prostate Cancer. Cell 173, 1770-1782, doi:10.1016/j.cell.2018.04.034 (2018).
 Lin, H. et al. Host expression of PD-L1 determines efficacy of PD-L1 pathway blockade-mediated tumor regression. J Clin Invest 128, 805-815, doi:10.1172/JCI96113 (2018).
 Li, W. et al. Aerobic Glycolysis Controls Myeloid-Derived Suppressor Cells and Tumor Immunity via a Specific CEBPB Isoform in Triple-Negative Breast Cancer. Cell Metab 28, 87-103, doi:10.1016/j.cmet.2018.04.022 (2018).
 Yu, T. et al. Fusobacterium nucleatum Promotes Chemoresistance to Colorectal Cancer by Modulating Autophagy. Cell 170, 548-563 e516, doi:10.1016/j.cell.2017.07.008 (2017).
 Xia H, W. W., Crespo J, Kryczek I, Li W, Wei S, Bian Z, Maj T, He M, Liu RJ, He Y, Rattan R, Munkarah A, Guan JL, Zou W. Suppression of FIP200 and autophagy by tumor-derived lactate promotes naive T cell apoptosis and affects tumor immunity. Science Immunology 2, doi:10.1126/sciimmunol.aan4631 (2017).
 Nagarsheth, N., Wicha, M. S. & Zou, W. Chemokines in the cancer microenvironment and their relevance in cancer immunotherapy. Nat Rev Immunol 17, 559-572, doi:10.1038/nri.2017.49 (2017).
 Maj, T. et al. Oxidative stress controls regulatory T cell apoptosis and suppressor activity and PD-L1-blockade resistance in tumor. Nat Immunol, doi:10.1038/ni.3868 (2017).
 Zou, W., Wolchok, J. D. & Chen, L. PD-L1 (B7-H1) and PD-1 pathway blockade for cancer therapy: Mechanisms, response biomarkers, and combinations. Science translational medicine 8, 328rv324 (2016).
 Zhao, E. et al. Cancer mediates effector T cell dysfunction by targeting microRNAs and EZH2 via glycolysis restriction. Nature immunology 17, 95-103 (2016).
 Wang, W. et al. Effector T Cells Abrogate Stroma-Mediated Chemoresistance in Ovarian Cancer. Cell 165, 1092-1105 (2016).
 Kryczek, I. et al. IL-22(+)CD4(+) T cells promote colorectal cancer stemness via STAT3 transcription factor activation and induction of the methyltransferase DOT1L. Immunity 40, 772-784, doi:10.1016/j.immuni.2014.03.010 (2014).
 Cui, T. X. et al. Myeloid-derived suppressor cells enhance stemness of cancer cells by inducing microRNA101 and suppressing the corepressor CtBP2. Immunity 39, 611-621, doi:10.1016/j.immuni.2013.08.025 (2013).
 Kryczek, I. et al. Human TH17 Cells Are Long-Lived Effector Memory Cells. Sci Transl Med 3, 104ra100, doi:10.1126/scitranslmed.3002949 (2011).
 Zou, W. & Chen, L. Inhibitory B7-family molecules in the tumour microenvironment. Nat Rev Immunol 8, 467-477 (2008).
 Zou, W. Immunosuppressive networks in the tumour environment and their therapeutic relevance. Nat Rev Cancer 5, 263-274 (2005).
 Curiel, T. J. et al. Specific recruitment of regulatory T cells in ovarian carcinoma fosters immune privilege and predicts reduced survival. Nat Med 10, 942-949, doi:10.1038/nm1093 (2004).
 Curiel, T. J. et al. Blockade of B7-H1 improves myeloid dendritic cell-mediated antitumor immunity. Nat Med 9, 562-567 (2003).
 Zou, W. et al. Stromal-derived factor-1 in human tumors recruits and alters the function of plasmacytoid precursor dendritic cells. Nat Med 7, 1339-1346. (2001).

Additional Publications

References 

1965 births
Cancer researchers
Living people
University of Michigan faculty